= Tom Mathias =

Welsh photographer (1866–1940)

Tom Mathias (1866–1940) was a self-taught photographer in rural West Wales. His photos captured daily life in Pembrokeshire around the turn of the last century. Using simple equipment and shooting exclusively outdoors, his photos show careful consideration of lighting, backgrounds, and posing unusual for the time. His work might have been lost had it not been for the discovery of some 500 of his half-plate glass negatives nearly 40 years after his death, and their restoration and printing by another photographer in the 1980s. Collections of his photos are held in the National Museum Wales and the Pembrokeshire Museum Services (see External Links).

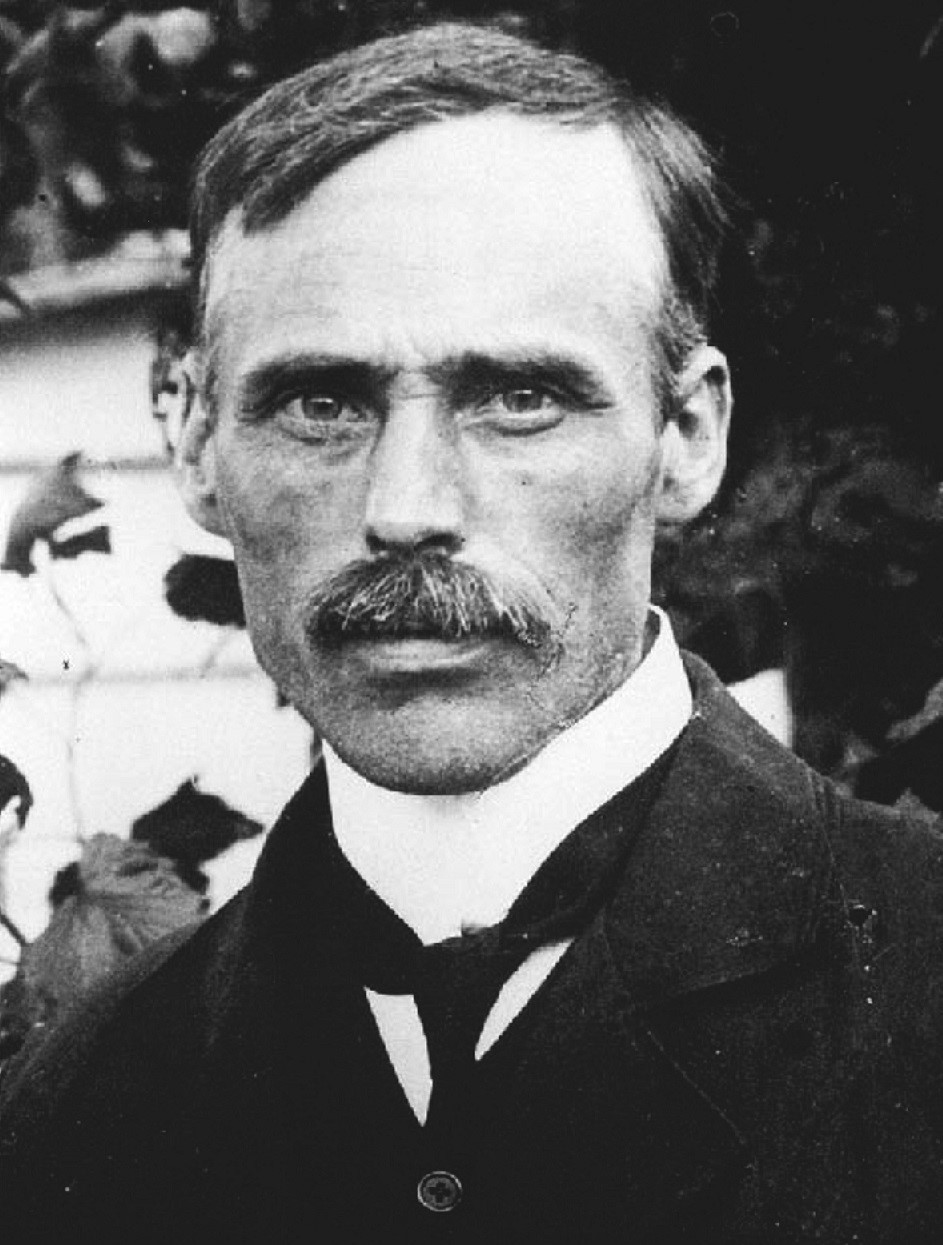
Tom Mathias

== Early life ==
Tom Mathias was born on 20 November 1866 in the hamlet of Pontrhydyceirt, on the outskirts of Cilgerran, Pembrokeshire, Wales. His parents were Frances Davies Mathias and James Mathias, a merchant mariner.

In August 1884, Mathias’s father’s ship, Resolven, was found drifting off the coast of Newfoundland, with all aboard missing, presumably drowned. Mathias, at the age of 18, was left to support the family. He found a job in the nearby market town of Cardigan as an insurance agent.

== Career ==
In the 1880s and 1890s, the town of Cardigan had at least two professional photography studios where Mathias may have developed his interest in the profession. By 1895, he had set off on his own; the 1901 Wales census lists his occupation as photographer. He never had a formal studio; he took all his photos outdoors, often in studio-like set-ups, and mostly within a five-mile radius of his home.

Much of his photography business involved taking photographs of the local gentry and their staff. This is how Mathias met his wife, Louise Paquier, who was the French governess for the Gower family of Castle Malgwyn. She had recently come to Wales from Bursins, Switzerland. They married in February 1897; his wedding license lists his occupation as photographer. The couple had two children: Frances Matilda (Tilla) in 1898, and James Henry in 1902.

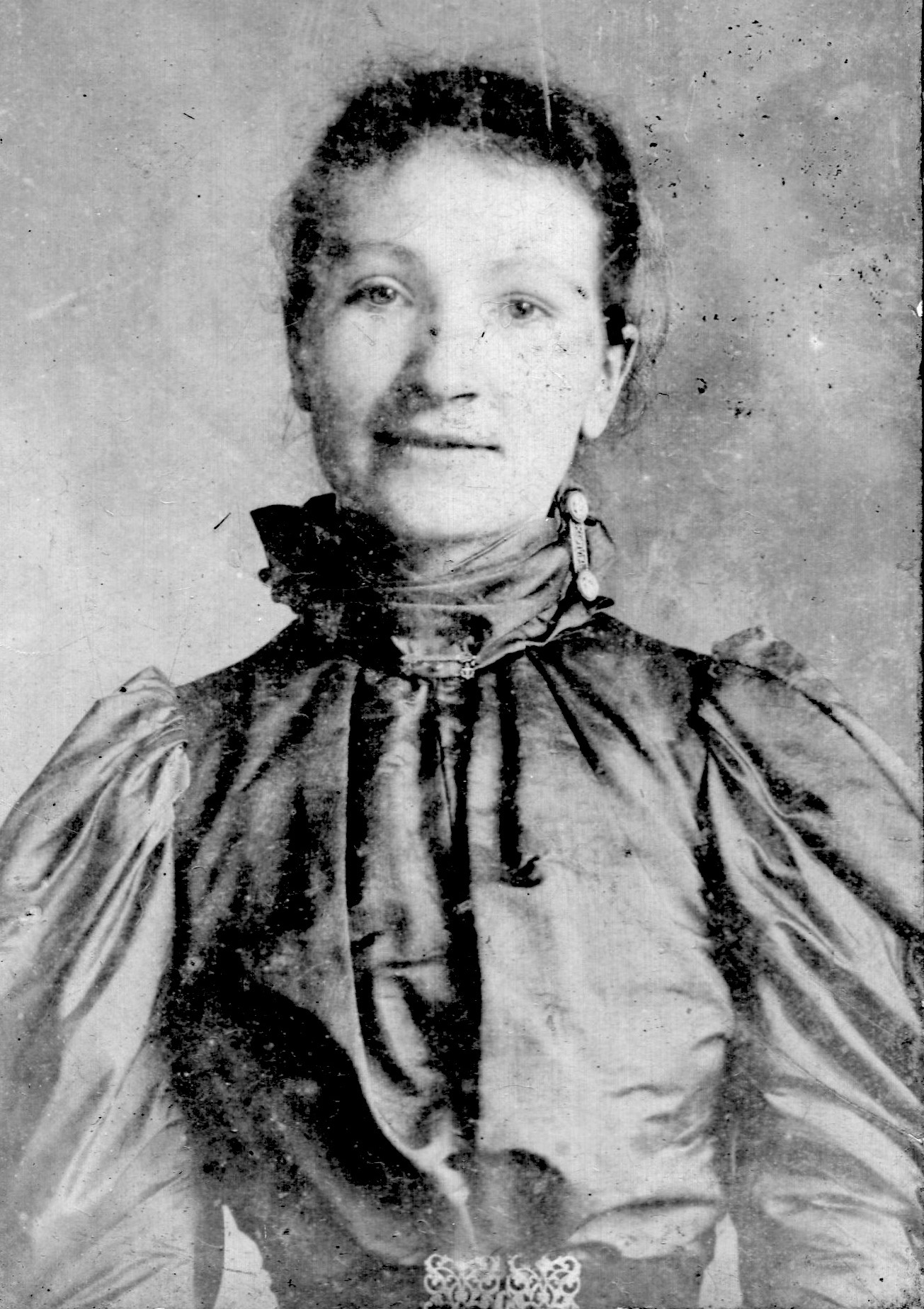
Louise Paquier, c. 1896 (photo by Tom Mathias)

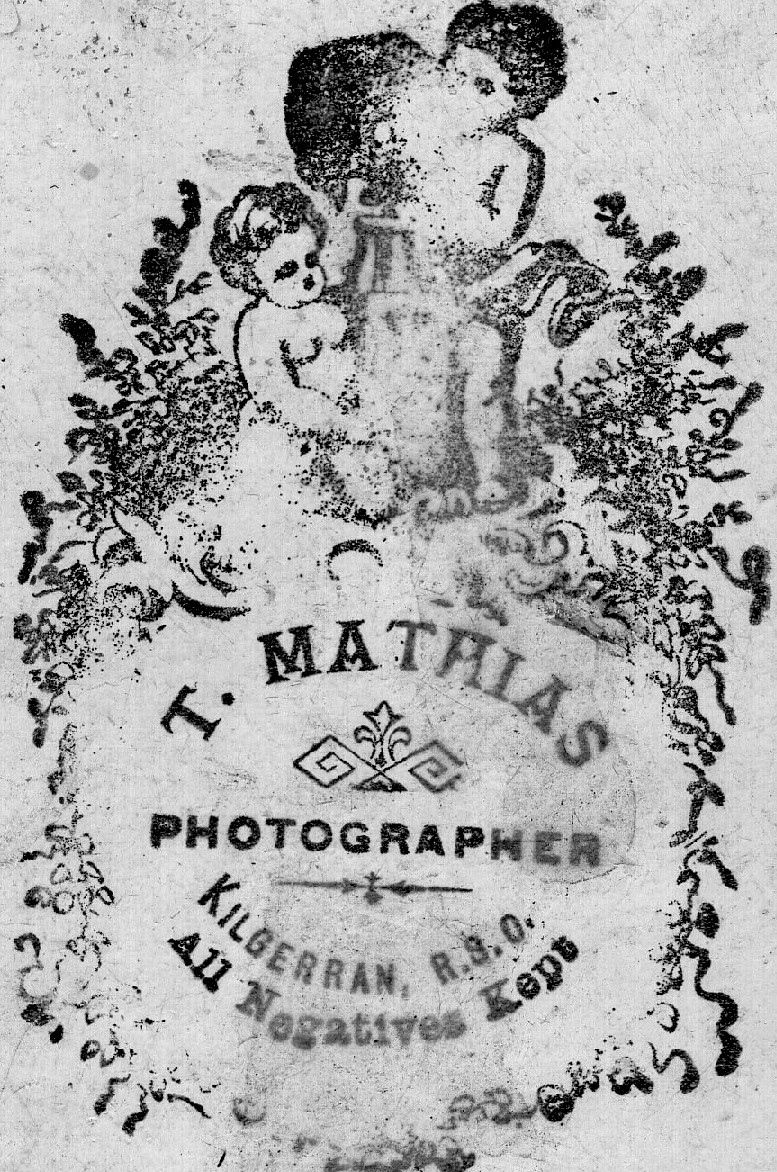
Back of the Louise Paquier photo

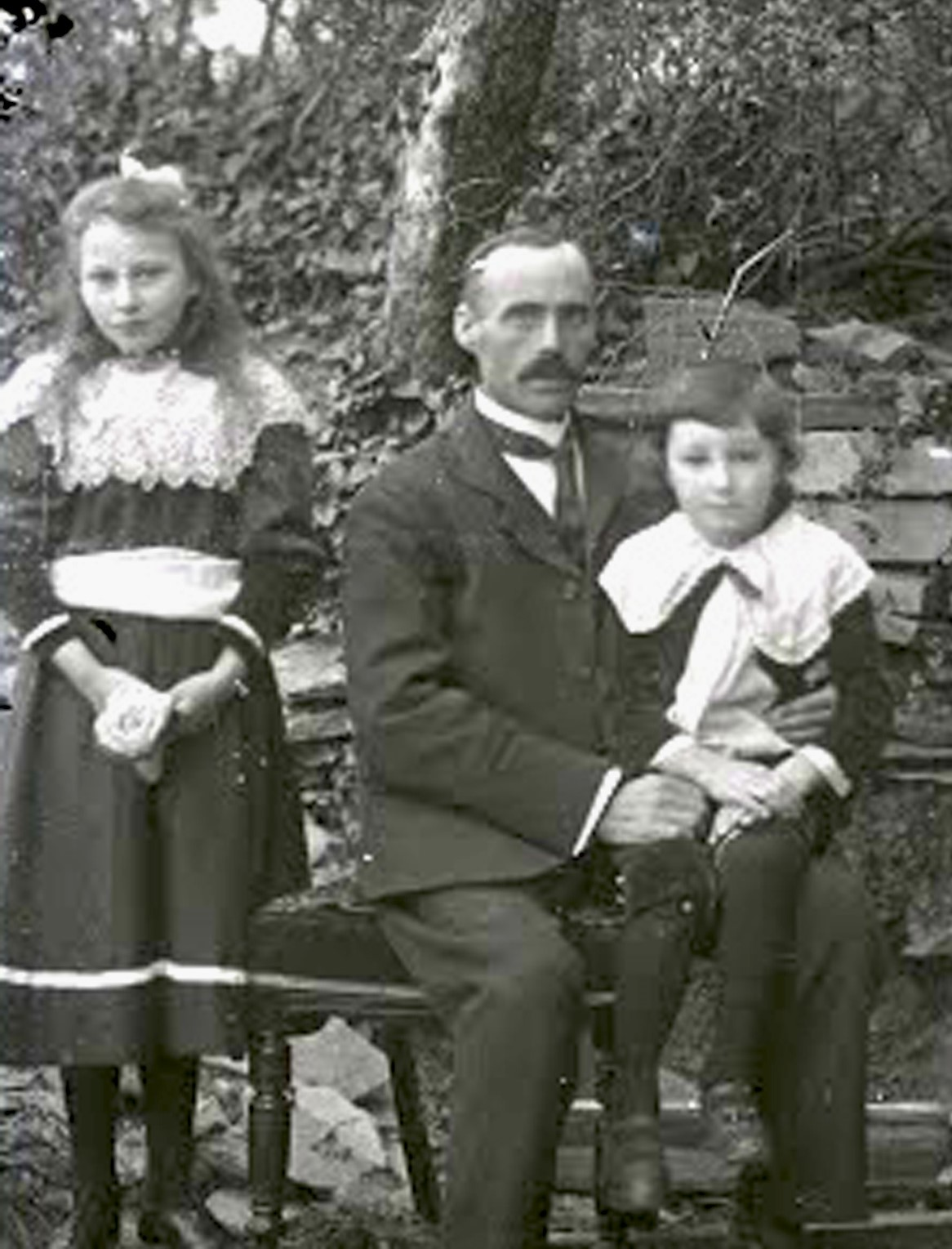
Tom Mathias with his two children, Tilla and James, c. 1907

Mathias taught school for a while as a young man. He had an avid interest in the world around him. He developed a variety of apple that would keep better over the winter; unusual for the time in his rural area, he owned a telescope and was an amateur astronomer; and he was a beekeeper, a source of family income. He was a deacon for many years at Llwynadda Chapel in nearby Llechryd.

Business directories listed Mathias as a photographer in Cilgerran from 1901 to 1926. The advent of affordable and compact Kodak cameras in the early 1900s slowly put an end to businesses like Mathias’s by the late 1920s.

In a book of his photographs published by the National Museum of Wales in 1995, the editor described Mathias’s work: “Using the simplest of equipment Mathias recorded daily life in the locality of his birth with insight and an affection which permeates all his work.” Although his paying business derived mostly from the local gentry estates, family portraits, weddings, and church and school outings, his most interesting subjects were documentary and unpaid. He captured slate quarrymen, timber workers, farmers, coopers, coracle-makers, fishermen, and bridge-builders at work. His photos form a unique social and economic history of the West Wales area during late eighteenth and early twentieth centuries.

More than 100 of his photos can be viewed on three Welsh museum websites; see External Links below.

== Death ==
Mathias died in March 1940 at the age of 73 and is buried at Llwynadda Chapel in Llechryd.

== The Photos Found and Restored in the 1980s ==
Mathias’s son, James, continued to live in the family home, Aberdyfan, in Cilgerran until his death in 1977. William and Mary Evans, neighbors who had known James, bought Aberdyfan. In the late 1970s, Mr. Evans began finding hundreds of Mathias’s photographic half-plate glass negatives in attics and outbuildings on the property. By chance one day he met J. Maxwell (Maxi) Davis, a recently retired photographer from the Royal Aircraft Establishment (RAE) Aberporth and told him about the plates and about Tom Mathias. Mr. Davis offered to try to make prints from the less damaged plates, most of which were more than 80 years old at the time.

Mr. Davis began the job of restoring and printing many of the photographs over the next several years. He was ultimately able to make prints of about 250 of them. Most of the people in the photos were eventually identified, thanks to the efforts of Mr. Davis’s wife, Peggy, and to the publication of many of them in a feature called “Can You Identify This Picture” in the local newspaper, The Cardigan & Tivyside Advertiser. In 1984, the first public showing of the photos took place in the Cilgerran Village Hall.

A second exhibit featuring additional photos was held in the Cilgerran Village Hall in 1987, which was attended by Mr. Mathias’s only grandchild, Nesta Griffiths Johnson.

== Exhibitions ==
- Cilgerran [Wales] Village Hall, August 1984
- Theatr Mwldan, Cardigan, Wales, June 1987
- Castle Museum and Art Gallery, Haverfordwest, Wales, November 1988-January 1989
- Welsh Folk Life Museum, St Fagans, Cardiff, Wales, January–March 1993
- Theatr Mwldan, Cardigan, Wales, September–November 2012
